CyberFight Festival 2022 was a professional wrestling event promoted by CyberFight for its four brands, DDT Pro-Wrestling (DDT), Pro Wrestling Noah (Noah), Tokyo Joshi Pro Wrestling (TJPW), and Ganbare☆Pro-Wrestling (GanPro). It took place on June 12, 2022, in Saitama, Japan, at the Saitama Super Arena and aired live on CyberFight's streaming service Wrestle Universe where it featured English commentary. 

The card will feature fourteen matches, with the first three being part of the Starting Battle pre-show.

It will be the second CyberFight promoted event under this name.

Production

Background
On September 1, 2017, the Japanese digital advertising company CyberAgent acquired 100% of DDT Pro-Wrestling's (DDT) shares, including its sub-brands Tokyo Joshi Pro Wrestling (TJPW) and Ganbare☆Pro-Wrestling (GanPro). On January 28, 2020, following months of negotiation, LIDET Entertainment sold its shares of Pro Wrestling Noah (Noah) to CyberAgent. On July 27, it was announced that Noah and DDT, along with TJPW and GanPro, would merge in a new promotion called CyberFight, which would oversee and promote the four individual promotions. The decision came after financial troubles faced by Noah and DDT due to the COVID-19 pandemic. On February 25, 2021, CyberFight president Sanshiro Takagi, CyberFight's executive vice-presidents Akito and Naomichi Marufuji, GanPro representative Ken Ohka, and TJPW representative Tetsuya Koda held a press conference, announcing that the four brands would be working together to promote an event on June 6 at the Saitama Super Arena. The following year, on January 11, it was announced a new CyberFight Festival would be held at the Saitama Super Arena on June 12, 2022.

Storylines
CyberFight Festival 2022 will feature professional wrestling matches that result from scripted storylines, where wrestlers portray villains, heroes, or less distinguishable characters in the scripted events that build tension and culminate in a wrestling match or series of matches.

On April 27, 2022, Kazuyuki Fujita had to vacate the GHC Heavyweight Championship after having tested positive for COVID-19. On April 30, at Majestic 2022, Go Shiozaki defeated Kaito Kiyomiya for the vacant title, and New Japan Pro-Wrestling's Satoshi Kojima was revealed as Naomichi Marufuji's mystery partner in their tag team match against Yoshiki Inamura and Kinya Okada. Hours after the event had concluded, it was announced that Kojima would challenge Shiozaki for the GHC Heavyweight title at CyberFight Festival.

Results

References

External links
Official CyberFight website (in Japanese)

2022 in professional wrestling
Professional wrestling in Japan
DDT Pro-Wrestling shows
Pro Wrestling Noah shows
Pro Wrestling Noah
CyberAgent
2022